Radio Stories (Spanish:Historias de la radio)  is a 1955 Spanish comedy film composed by three episodes directed by José Luis Sáenz de Heredia. A decade later the director returned to the theme with his Television Stories which updated the plot, but was less successful.

Plot 
As a tribute to the importance of radio in the mid-20th century, three stories are told whose central axis is the listeners: some contestants who for 3,000 pesetas have to come to the studio dressed as an Eskimo, a thief who answers a call from a phone in the house where he is stealing and a school teacher who participates in a contest to get money to cure a child in his town.  The stories are linked through the love story of an announcer and his fiancée and through snippets of the lives of real characters from the time of the film. The copla singer Gracia Montes appears in the film singing a popular song from Andalusia: La Romera. That singer would become one of the fundamental pillars of the copla and flamenco in Spain in the future. Other celebrities of the time that appear in the film are the bullfighter Rafael Gómez Ortega 'el Gallo' and the soccer player Luis Molowny. Years later, Sáenz de Heredia would direct Historias de la Televisión, a sort of sequel to Historias de la Radio set in television.

References

Bibliography 
 Bentley, Bernard. A Companion to Spanish Cinema. Boydell & Brewer 2008.

External links 
 

1955 films
Spanish anthology films
Spanish black-and-white films
1955 comedy films
Madrid in fiction
Spain in fiction
1950s Spanish-language films
Films directed by José Luis Sáenz de Heredia
Films scored by Ernesto Halffter
Spanish comedy films
1950s Spanish films